Handmade is the debut album by Hindi Zahra, released in 2010. A Deluxe edition was released in 2011 that also included previously unreleased tracks.

Track listing

Handmade (2010 edition)

Handmade Deluxe edition (2011)
Same as 2010 edition with the additional unplugged tracks:

12. "Ahiawa" (Unplugged)
13. "The Man I Love" (Unplugged)
14. "Beautiful Tango" (Unplugged)
15. "Oursoul" (Unplugged)
16. "He Needs Me" (Unplugged)
17. "Don't Forget" (Unplugged)

Certifications

2010 albums